The 42nd British Academy Film Awards, given by the British Academy of Film and Television Arts in 1989, honoured the best films of 1988.

Jeremy Thomas' and Bernardo Bertolucci's The Last Emperor won the award for Best Film.

Winners and nominees
Academy Fellowship: Alec Guinness

Statistics

See also
 61st Academy Awards
 14th César Awards
 41st Directors Guild of America Awards
 2nd European Film Awards
 46th Golden Globe Awards
 9th Golden Raspberry Awards
 3rd Goya Awards
 4th Independent Spirit Awards
 15th Saturn Awards
 41st Writers Guild of America Awards

References

Film042
British Academy Film Awards
British Academy Film Awards
British Academy Film Awards
British Academy Film Awards
1988 awards in the United Kingdom